Montcusel is a commune in the Jura department and Bourgogne-Franche-Comté region of eastern France.

See also 
 Communes of the Jura department

References 

Communes of Jura (department)